Sebastian Schönberger (born 14 May 1994) is an Austrian racing cyclist, who currently rides for UCI ProTeam . He rode at the 2013 UCI Road World Championships.

Major results
2016
 8th Overall East Bohemia Tour
2018
 5th Overall Czech Cycling Tour
2019
 3rd Overall Tour of Albania
1st  Mountains classification
 4th Road race, National Road Championships
2020
 5th Road race, National Road Championships
2021
 3rd Tour de Vendée
 6th Overall Tour de Savoie Mont-Blanc
 6th Boucles de l'Aulne
2022
 6th Boucles de l'Aulne
2023
 1st  Points classification, O Gran Camiño

Grand Tour general classification results timeline

References

External links
 

1994 births
Living people
Austrian male cyclists
People from Braunau am Inn District
Sportspeople from Upper Austria